The Savage Rose is a Danish psychedelic rock group, formed in 1967.

Career 
The band was founded in 1967 by Thomas Koppel, Anders Koppel, Alex Riel, Jens Rugsted, Flemming Ostermann, and singer Annisette Koppel. Ilse Marie Koppel was also participating. Nils Tuxen replaced Flemming Ostermann from their second album.

Since the mid-1970s, the group was an acoustic trio consisting of Thomas Koppel, Annisette Koppel (then Hansen) and John Ravn as a core. From the beginning of the 1990s, the group returned to electric instrumentation. Thomas Koppel died on February 25, 2006.

After the release of Love and Freedom in 2012, Savage Rose went on tour, but in Christmas 2013 they were back in the studio recording new songs and re-recording old songs. The album titled Roots of the Wasteland was released in April 2014; after 47 years and 21 studio albums, they are still going strong. The first single "Mr. World" was released April 12, 2014 and the new album was released May 19.

In 1996 The Savage Rose received a Danish Music Award for the album Black Angel, which was recorded in the US. The band's debut album, The Savage Rose, was chosen as part of the Danish Culture Canon in 2006.

On February 10, 2017, it was announced on their Facebook page that The Savage Rose will be releasing a new studio album as they tour to celebrate their 50-year anniversary.

On August 10, 2017, a new single "Woman" was released and the date for their new studio album Homeless was September 15, 2017.

Reception
In Christgau's Record Guide: Rock Albums of the Seventies (1981), Robert Christgau wrote of the Savage Rose's 1970 LP Your Daily Gift: "This band has a knack for combining funky riffs with persistent melodies (borrowed from where, this ignorant American wonders). But though Annisette's multi-octave Lolita voice is certainly distinctive, I find her about as sexy as Yma Sumac, and as long as she sings Anders Koppel's lyrics she won't be any font of wisdom either." He appreciated the "fast tempos, soul piano," and production of their Jimmy Miller-produced Refugee (1971) more, saying they "do wonders for Anisette's come-on, and the lyrics prove that getting laid is a universal language. Death, too."

Discography

Albums

Studio albums
{| class="wikitable plainrowheaders" style="text-align:center;"
! rowspan="2" scope="col" style="width:15em;" | Title
! rowspan="2" scope="col" style="width:15em;" | Album details
! colspan="2" |Peak chart positions
|-
! scope="col" style="width:2em;font-size:90%;" | DEN<ref name=":0">Peak positions for Savage Rose's albums in Denmark:
 Travelin''': 
 Your Daily Gift: 
 Babyon: 
 Dødens Triumf: 
 Tameless: 
 Since 2000: </ref>
! scope="col" style="width:2em;font-size:90%;" | NOR
|-
! scope="row" |The Savage Rose|
 Released: July 1968
 Label: Polydor
 Formats: LP
|—
|12
|-
! scope="row" |In the Plain|
 Released: December 1968
 Label: Polydor
 Formats: LP, MC
|—
|—
|-
! scope="row" |Travelin'
|
 Released: November 1969
 Label: Polydor
 Formats: LP, MC
|3
|6
|-
! scope="row" |Your Daily Gift|
 Released: November 1970
 Label: Polydor, RCA
 Formats: LP, MC, 8-track
|10
|18
|-
! scope="row" |Refugee|
 Released: September 1971
 Label: Polydor, RCA
 Formats: LP, MC
|—
|—
|-
! scope="row" |Dødens triumf|
 Released: May 1972
 Label: Polydor
 Formats: LP, MC
 Meaning: Triumph of Death|2
|—
|-
! scope="row" |Babylon|
 Released: January 1973
 Label: Polydor
 Formats: LP, MC
|9
|—
|-
! scope="row" |Wild Child|
 Released: 1973
 Label: Polydor
 Formats: LP, MC
|—
|—
|-
! scope="row" |Solen var også din|
 Released: 1978
 Label: Sonet
 Formats: LP, MC
 Meaning: The Sun Was Yours Too|—
|—
|-
! scope="row" |En vugge af stål|
 Released: 1982
 Label: Nexø Forlag
 Formats: LP
 Meaning: Cradle of Steel|—
|—
|-
! scope="row" |Vi kæmper for at sejre|
 Released: 1984
 Label: Nexø Forlag
 Formats: LP, MC
 Meaning: We Struggle for Victory|—
|—
|-
! scope="row" |Kejserens nye klæder|
 Released: 1986
 Label: Rosen
 Formats: LP
 Meaning: The Emperor's New Clothes|—
|—
|-
! scope="row" |Sangen for livet|
 Released: February 1988
 Label: Nexø Forlag
 Formats: CD, LP, MC
 Meaning: The Song for Life|—
|—
|-
! scope="row" |Ild og Frihed|
 Released: 1989
 Label: Nexø Forlag
 Formats: 2xCD, 2xLP, MC
 Meaning: Fire and Freedom|—
|—
|-
! scope="row" |Gadens dronning|
 Released: 1990
 Label: RCA
 Formats: CD, LP, MC
 Meaning: Queen of the Streets|—
|—
|-
! scope="row" |Månebarn|
 Released: 1992
 Label: EMI
 Formats: CD, LP, MC
 Meaning: Moonchild|—
|—
|-
! scope="row" |Black Angel|
 Released: 1995
 Label: Mega
 Formats: CD, MC
|—
|9
|-
! scope="row" |Tameless|
 Released: 29 October 1998
 Label: Mega
 Formats: CD
|14
|19
|-
! scope="row" |For Your Love|
 Released: 26 October 2001
 Label: Mega
 Formats: CD
|10
|—
|-
! scope="row" |Universal Daughter|
 Released: 19 November 2007
 Label: Columbia/Sony BMG
 Formats: CD
|13
|34
|-
! scope="row" |Love and Freedom|
 Released: 10 September 2012
 Label: Nordic Music Society
 Formats: CD, LP
|8
|—
|-
! scope="row" |Roots of the Wasteland|
 Released: 19 May 2014
 Label: Target
 Formats: CD, LP
|3
|—
|-
! scope="row" |Homeless|
 Released: 15 September 2017
 Label: Target
 Formats: CD, LP, digital download
|5
|—
|-
| colspan="4" style="font-size:90%" |"—" denotes releases that did not chart or were not released in that territory.
|}

Live albums

Compilation albums

Singles
{| class="wikitable plainrowheaders" style="text-align:center;"
! rowspan="2" scope="col" style="width:17em;" | Title
! rowspan="2" scope="col" style="width:2em;" | Year
!Peak chart positions
! rowspan="2" |Album
|-
! scope="col" style="width:2em;font-size:90%;" | DEN
|-
! scope="row" |"A Girl I Knew"
| rowspan="3" |1968
|8
|The Savage Rose|-
! scope="row" |"Evening's Child"
|8
| rowspan="2" |In the Plain|-
! scope="row" |"Long Before I Was Born"
|5
|-
! scope="row" |Birthday Day"/"The Schoolteacher Said So"
| rowspan="3" |1969
|4
|
|-
! scope="row" |"Travelin'"
|10
| rowspan="2" |Travelin'|-
! scope="row" |"My Family Was Gay" (US-only release)
|—
|-
! scope="row" |"Sunday Morning"
| rowspan="3" |1971
|19
|Your Daily Gift|-
! scope="row" |"Walking in the Line"
|—
| rowspan="2" |Refugee|-
! scope="row" |"Revival Day"
|—
|-
! scope="row" |"The Messenger Speaks"
|1972
|—
|Babylon|-
! scope="row" |"Der sejler et skib (Sangen til Mia)"
| rowspan="2" |1989
|—
| rowspan="2" 
|-
! scope="row" |"Stjerneskud (Når lysene tændes i parken)"
|12
|-
! scope="row" |"Solen var også din"
|1990
|—
|Gadens dronning|-
! scope="row" |"Den største af alt er kærlighed"
|1991
|—
|
|-
! scope="row" |"Fri som en sommervind"
|1992
|—
|Månebarn|-
! scope="row" |"Run Rose"
|1996
|—
|Black Angel|-
! scope="row" |"Pigestemmer"
|2001
|—
|
|-
! scope="row" |"A World Aflame (Not in Your Name)"
|2002
|—
|The Anthology|-
! scope="row" |"I Hear Them Coming"
|2007
|—
|Universal Daughter|-
! scope="row" |"Woman"
|2017
|—
| rowspan="2" |Homeless|-
! scope="row" |"Harassing"
|2018
|—
|-
| colspan="4" style="font-size:90%" |"—" denotes releases that did not chart or were not released in that territory.
|}

Guest appearances
 1969  Newport Jazz Festival 
 1974 Ragnarock'73 (The shoeshine boy is dead) "Ragnarock was a Rockfestival in Norway '73, '74 and '75 and released one LP"
 1976 Christiania (De vilde blomster gror)
 1976 Christiania (I kan ikke slå os ihjel) "Recorded by Bifrost with Annisette, Poul Dissing and Sebastian on Vocals"
 2004 Bevar Christiania'' (Junglebarn)

References

External links 
 Official site

 
 

Danish rock music groups
Musical groups established in 1967
Danish progressive rock groups
Danish psychedelic rock music groups
Danish blues rock musical groups